Deep Down & Dirty is the fourth studio album by the British electronic band Stereo MC's, released on 28 May 2001, nine years after the album Connected. The album maintains a similar style to its predecessor with deep-groove, beatbox funk, nods to soul-jazz and gospel though music critics at the time noted its grittier, edgier approach. The title track was released as the album's first single. It was recorded at Frontline Studios, Brixton, London.

Background 
The Stereo MC's toured from 1992 until 1994 in support of their previous album, Connected following the resounding success of its 1992 release which earned two coveted Brit Awards (including album of the year) before taking an extended hiatus due to being "burnt out" explained Nick "the Head" Hallam in a Billboard interview. "It got to a point where Rob and I weren't even really talking -- and this went on for about one year. This was particularly bizarre, as we've known each other since we were 6 years old." During their absence, the two formed a publishing company (Spirit Songs) and an independent label (Response Records). They also remixed U2's "Mysterious Ways" and Madonna's "Frozen" under the Ultimatum alias. In 2000 they mixed a volume of the DJ Kicks series for German imprint Studio !K7.

The first single released was the title track, Deep Down and Dirty and was issued to modern rock and college radio at the end of April. Club DJs were issued remixes of the track (by Jon Carter and Two Lone Swordsmen).

Reception

The album was met with mixed to positive reaction from music critics, scoring 68% on Metacritic, 4 stars out of 5 on Allmusic and peaked at no 17 on the UK charts. Mojo gave it 60 out of 100 and said "If all you want to do is throw the same funky shapes you threw a decade ago, this long-awaited outing will more than suffice. Otherwise, it's the same old same old". Stephen Dalton from NME gave a scathing review of the album, saying "This is so grindingly pedestrian you almost feel sorry for these one-time pioneers.

Track listing 
 "Deep Down & Dirty" – 4:23
 "We Belong in This World Together" – 4:40
 "Breeze" – 4:25
 "Running" – 4:53
 "Graffiti Part One" – 2:34
 "Graffiti Part Two" – 2:49
 "Sofisticated" – 4:14
 "Traffic" – 5:17
 "The Right Effect" – 4:40
 "Stop at Nothing" – :01
 "Unconscious" – 4:06
 "Shameless" – 4:53
Total running time: 50:55

Personnel 
Stereo MC's
 Rob Birch
 Nick Hallam
 Cath Coffey
 Vernoa Davis
 Andrea Groves
 Owen If

Additional
 Carol Kenyon – vocals
 Delance Curtis – vocals
 Angela Murrell – vocals
 Sam Scott – vocals
 The Kick Horns – flute, brass
 John Eacott – trumpet
 Malcolm Earle Smith – trombone
 Kwaku "Reg" Dzidzornu – percussion
 The Head – DJ
 Leon Mar – bass, pre-production
 Neil Douglas – engineer
 Mike Marsh – mastering
 Stereo MC's – producer

Charts

Certifications

References 

Stereo MCs albums
2001 albums
Electronic albums by British artists
Hip hop albums by British artists
Island Records albums